The 1903 VFL Grand Final was an Australian rules football game contested between the Collingwood Football Club and Fitzroy Football Club, held at the Melbourne Cricket Ground in Melbourne on 12 September 1903. It was the 6th annual Grand Final of the Victorian Football League, staged to determine the premiers for the 1903 VFL season. The match, attended by 32,263 spectators, was won by Collingwood by a margin of 2 points, marking that club's second successive premiership victory.

Gerald Brosnan had a chance to win Fitzroy the premiership with a set shot for goal off the last kick of the game but missed narrowly to give Collingwood back-to-back flags.

Collingwood's Jim Addison, despite playing in just his third game, was the only multiple goalkicker. Both Ern Jenkins and Bert Sharpe of Fitzroy were celebrating their 100th VFL games.

Lead-up

After the home-and-away season (which lasted for seventeen matches, including the "first round" of fourteen matches and a "second round" of three matches), Collingwood was top of the ladder with a record of 15–2 and a percentage of 159.4; Fitzroy finished second with a record of 14–3 and a percentage of 171.6.

The finals were contested using the variation of the amended Argus system seen between 1902–1906. Fitzroy faced fourth-placed  in the First Semi-Final, and won by 52 points, and Collingwood faced third-placed  in the Second Semi-Final and won by four points. Collingwood and Fitzroy then faced off to decide the premiers.

Right to challenge
Under the variation of the Argus System in use between 1902–1906, the club with the best record in all matches (including finals) could have challenged for the premiership if it had not won this game.

However, the team that won this game would have become the team with the best record, depriving the other team of the right to challenge, meaning the winner of this match would automatically win the premiership.

Entering the match, Collingwood had a record of 16–2, and Fitzroy had a record of 15–3, but a superior percentage. Therefore, a Collingwood win would have their 17–2 record have ranked above Fitzroy's 15–4, and while a Fitzroy win would have left both clubs level on 16–3, Fitzroy would have been ranked above Collingwood on percentage.

This is different from the ruling which would have been used under the more widely known variation of the Argus System, which was in use from 1907–1930. In that variation, the team with the best record in matches excluding finals had the right to challenge; as Collingwood had the best record after 17 weeks, it would have retained the right to challenge regardless of finals results.

Teams

 Umpire – Dick Gibson

Statistics

Goalkickers

Attendance
 MCG crowd – 32,263

References

1903 VFL Grand Final statistics
 The Official statistical history of the AFL 2004 
 Ross, J. (ed), 100 Years of Australian Football 1897–1996: The Complete Story of the AFL, All the Big Stories, All the Great Pictures, All the Champions, Every AFL Season Reported, Viking, (Ringwood), 1996.

See also
 1903 VFL season

VFL/AFL Grand Finals
Grand
Collingwood Football Club
Fitzroy Football Club
September 1903 sports events